DeMarcus Amir Cousins (born August 13, 1990) is an American professional basketball player who last played for the Denver Nuggets of the National Basketball Association (NBA). Nicknamed "Boogie", he played college basketball for the Kentucky Wildcats, where he was an All-American in 2010. He left Kentucky after one season, and was selected with the fifth overall pick in the 2010 NBA draft by the Sacramento Kings. In his first season with the Kings, Cousins was named to the NBA All-Rookie First Team, and from 2015 to 2019, he was named an NBA All-Star four times. He is also a two-time gold medal winner as a member of the United States national team, winning his first in 2014 at the FIBA Basketball World Cup and his second in 2016 at the Rio Olympics.

High school career
Cousins attended LeFlore Magnet High School. He was a first-team Parade All-American in 2009 and played in the 2009 McDonald's All-American Boys Game, finishing with 14 points and 8 rebounds. Cousins also played in the 2009 Nike Hoop Summit at the Rose Garden in Portland and the Jordan Brand Classic at Madison Square Garden where he scored 10 points for the black team. He led LeFlore to the Alabama class 6A Final Four against Hillcrest that beat Austin High School to progress to the state championship; falling short to future college teammate Eric Bledsoe and Parker High School.

College career

Cousins first committed to Alabama-Birmingham on February 28, 2008, but never signed a letter of intent. Cousins decommitted from UAB and committed to Memphis on March 9, 2009. He reopened his recruitment after then Memphis coach John Calipari was hired at Kentucky. On April 7, 2009, Cousins decided to follow John Calipari to Kentucky. He signed his letter of intent on April 15. At Kentucky, Cousins averaged 15.1 points, 9.8 rebounds and 1.8 blocks per game. Led by Cousins and John Wall, the Wildcats reached the Elite Eight of the 2010 NCAA Tournament.

Professional career

Sacramento Kings (2010–2017)

2010–14: All-Rookie honors and controversies
On April 7, 2010, Cousins announced that he would forgo his final three seasons of collegiate eligibility and enter the 2010 NBA draft, where he was selected by the Sacramento Kings with the fifth overall pick. On July 7, 2010, Cousins signed his rookie contract with the Kings, worth about $7 million for the first two years with a team option for the third and fourth years. Cousins was named the Rookie of the Month for July during the NBA Summer League. Cousins was also named to the NBA All-Rookie First Team at the end of the 2010–11 season.

On January 1, 2012, head coach Paul Westphal sent Cousins home from the Kings' home game against the New Orleans Hornets, saying that Cousins was "unwilling/unable to embrace traveling in the same direction as his team; it cannot be ignored indefinitely." Cousins, who had been averaging 13.0 points and 11.3 rebounds per game at the time of the dismissal, reportedly demanded to be traded from the Kings. Cousins later denied asking to be traded.

On January 5, 2012, Westphal was fired from the Kings, leading many to speculate that the head coach's tumultuous relationship with Cousins was a factor in his being replaced. On February 8, 2012, Cousins was selected to play in the Rising Stars Challenge. He played for Team Chuck, with a mix of rookies and sophomores.
On November 11, 2012, the league suspended Cousins for two games without pay for confronting San Antonio Spurs color commentator Sean Elliott "in a hostile manner" after he criticized Cousins for attempting to bully Tim Duncan on the court. Cousins was apparently informed of Elliott's remarks after the game. He left the locker room and waited on the court for Elliott to finish his post-game show before confronting him. Some criticized the suspension as overly harsh and based more on Cousins' reputation than what actually happened, while others said he needed to grow up and learn a lesson about confronting the media. Cousins apologized to Elliott in person before a game against the Spurs in March 2014, which Elliott said he appreciated.

On December 22, 2012, Cousins was suspended indefinitely from the Kings, who accused him of "unprofessional behavior and conduct detrimental to the team". The suspension was lifted on December 24, 2012. The season was up-and-down for Cousins, who posted career-highs in Player Efficiency Rating, field goal percentage, and free throw percentage, but led the NBA with 16 Technical Foul infractions, was ejected several times and suspended by both the league and the Kings.
On September 30, 2013, Cousins signed a reported four-year, $62 million contract extension with the Kings. After signing the contract, Cousins announced he would donate $1 million of his salary to the families and community of Sacramento. He opened the season with a 30-point, 14-rebound performance against the Denver Nuggets.

On February 26, 2014, Cousins received a one-game suspension for punching Patrick Beverley in the stomach. On March 11, Cousins recorded a career-high 6 blocks, along with 13 points and 14 rebounds, in an 89–99 loss to the Detroit Pistons.

2014–16: First All-Star and All-NBA appearances
After averaging career-highs of 23.5 points, 12.6 rebounds and 1.5 blocks over the first 15 games of the season, Cousins was diagnosed with viral meningitis on December 7, 2014. He subsequently missed 10 games with the virus and showed no signs of a let up in his return to action on December 18 against the Milwaukee Bucks as he recorded 27 points and 11 rebounds in the 107–108 loss.

On January 30, 2015, Cousins was named to replace the injured Kobe Bryant as a Western Conference All-Star in the 2015 NBA All-Star Game. Cousins' selection marked the first time a Kings player earned All-Star honors since Brad Miller and Peja Stojaković represented Sacramento in 2004.

On April 1, 2015, Cousins recorded his second career triple-double with 24 points, 21 rebounds, 10 assists, 6 blocks and 3 steals in a 111–115 loss to the Houston Rockets. In doing so, he became just the fourth player in NBA history to collect 20+ points, 20+ rebounds, 10+ assists and 5+ blocks in a single game, joining Kareem Abdul-Jabbar, Chris Webber and Tim Duncan. In the following game on April 3 against the New Orleans Pelicans, Cousins became the first Kings player to record back-to-back triple doubles since Chris Webber did so in 2005. In just under 42 minutes of action, he recorded 24 points, 20 rebounds and a career-high 13 assists in a 95–101 loss. He joined elite company as one of only three players to have consecutive 20-point, 20-rebound, 10-assist games; the others being Elgin Baylor and Wilt Chamberlain.

On October 28, 2015, Cousins recorded 32 points and 13 rebounds, as well as 4-of-5 three-pointers, in a season opening loss to the Los Angeles Clippers. Cousins had hit just four three-pointers in his previous 167 games and had never hit more than four in an entire season. After missing four games with an Achilles injury between November 3–7, Cousins returned to action on November 9, and recorded 21 points and 12 rebounds in a loss to the San Antonio Spurs. Cousins went 4-of-5 from three-point range for a second time on November 11, finishing the game with 33 points to help the Kings defeat the Detroit Pistons 101–92. Two days later, he scored a season-high 40 points in a 111–109 win over the Brooklyn Nets. On November 16, he was named Western Conference Player of the Week for games played Monday, November 9 through Sunday, November 15. It was the third career Player of the Week award for Cousins, who led the Kings to a 3–1 record on the week.

On January 4, 2016, Cousins recorded 33 points and a season-high 19 rebounds in a 116–104 win over the Oklahoma City Thunder. On January 21, in a win over the Atlanta Hawks, he recorded 24 points and 15 rebounds for his ninth straight double-double and his 24th of the season in 34 games. On January 23, he scored a career-high 48 points in a 108–97 win over the Indiana Pacers. On January 25, he was named Western Conference Player of the Week for a second time in 2015–16. He went on to top his career-high mark in emphatic fashion that night, scoring 56 points in a 129–128 double overtime loss to the Charlotte Hornets. His 56 points set a record for the 2015–16 season, and broke Chris Webber's franchise record of 51 points. On January 28, he was named a Western Conference All-Star reserve for the 2016 NBA All-Star Game, earning his second straight All-Star nod. On February 5, he recorded his first triple-double of the season and fourth of his career with 24 points, 10 rebounds and 10 assists in a 128–119 loss to the Brooklyn Nets. On February 19, he had 37 points, 20 rebounds and four blocks against the Denver Nuggets, recording his ninth career double-double with 20-plus points and rebounds, breaking the previous Sacramento record set by Webber.

2016–17: Final season in Sacramento
In the Kings' season opener on October 26, Cousins scored a game-high 24 points in a 113–94 win over the Phoenix Suns. He backed that up the following night against the San Antonio Spurs, recording 37 points and 16 rebounds in a 102–94 loss. On October 31, with 14 points and 12 rebounds against the Atlanta Hawks, Cousins became the Kings' career double-doubles leader with 246, surpassing Chris Webber's 245. On November 18, he scored a season-high 38 points in a 121–115 loss to the Los Angeles Clippers. On December 20, he set a new season high with 55 points in a 126–121 win over the Portland Trail Blazers. On January 18, 2017, he recorded his fifth career triple-double with 25 points, 12 rebounds and 10 assists in a 106–100 loss to the Indiana Pacers. On January 30, 2017, he was named Western Conference Player of the Week for games played Monday, January 23 through Sunday, January 29. On February 3, 2017, Cousins recorded his sixth career triple-double with 22 points, 12 rebounds and 12 assists in a 105–103 loss to the Phoenix Suns. Four days later, he was suspended one game without pay for receiving his 16th technical foul of the 2016–17 season. In addition, Cousins was fined $25,000 for making an inappropriate statement and gesture after leaving the playing court following the Kings' 109–106 overtime win against the Golden State Warriors on February 4 at Golden 1 Center.

New Orleans Pelicans (2017–2018)

On February 20, 2017, Cousins and teammate Omri Casspi were traded to the New Orleans Pelicans in exchange for Tyreke Evans, Buddy Hield, Langston Galloway, and 2017 first-round and second-round draft picks. He made his debut for the Pelicans three days later, recording 27 points and 14 rebounds in a 129–99 loss to the Houston Rockets. On March 3, 2017, he had 19 points and a season-high 23 rebounds in a 101–98 overtime loss to the San Antonio Spurs. His 23 rebounds tied the Pelicans' franchise record held by Tyson Chandler. Two days later, he had 26 points and 15 rebounds before fouling out in the Pelicans' 105–97 win over the Los Angeles Lakers, marking Cousins' first win as a Pelican. On March 21, 2017, Cousins had his most prolific performance as a Pelican, recording 41 points and 17 rebounds in a 95–82 win over the Memphis Grizzlies. Ten days later, he had 37 points and 13 rebounds in his first game against Sacramento, a game the Pelicans won 117–89. Cousins tied a career high during the game with five three-pointers.

On October 26, 2017, Cousins recorded 41 points and 23 rebounds in a 114–106 win over the Kings in Sacramento. Two days later, he recorded his first triple-double of the season with 29 points, 12 rebounds and 10 assists in a 123–101 win over the Cleveland Cavaliers. He was subsequently named Western Conference Player of the Week for games played October 23–29. On November 3, 2017, he had 20 points, 22 rebounds and seven assists in a 99–94 win over the Dallas Mavericks, tying his career high with 20 defensive rebounds. On December 2, 2017, he scored 38 points in a 123–116 win over the Portland Trail Blazers. Four days later, he had 40 points, 22 rebounds and four blocks in a 123–114 win over the Denver Nuggets. On December 29, 2017, he had 32 points and 20 rebounds in a 128–120 loss to the Dallas Mavericks. It was his third game of the season with at least 30 points and 20 rebounds, making him the first player to do that since Kevin Love in 2010–11.

On January 22, 2018, Cousins had 44 points, 24 rebounds and 10 assists in a 132–128 double overtime win over the Chicago Bulls. He became the first NBA player since Hall of Famer Kareem Abdul-Jabbar in 1972 to have as many as 40 points, 20 rebounds and 10 assists in a game. It was also just the 10th 40-point, 20-rebound, 10-assist game in NBA history. On January 26, 2018, he had 15 points, 13 rebounds and 11 assists before injuring his left Achilles in the final seconds of the Pelicans' 115–113 win over the Houston Rockets. Following the game, he was diagnosed with a torn left Achilles, and on January 31, he underwent season-ending surgery.

Golden State Warriors (2018–2019)
After not receiving any outstanding contract offers from other teams, Cousins turned his attention to signing with an elite team with the midlevel exception. Cousins called Golden State general manager Bob Myers about joining the Warriors and followed this by speaking to Kevin Durant, Stephen Curry and Draymond Green. He subsequently accepted the Warriors' midlevel exception, signing a reported one-year deal for $5.3 million on July 6, 2018. On December 10, 2018, with Cousins nearing a return to the court for the first time since rupturing his left Achilles tendon, he was assigned to Golden State's NBA G League affiliate team, the Santa Cruz Warriors, where he had his first full-contact practice. On January 18, 2019, Cousins made his debut for the Warriors, scoring 14 points before fouling out of the 112–94 win over the Los Angeles Clippers. On April 2, he scored a season-high 28 points to go with 13 rebounds in a 116–102 win over the Denver Nuggets. On April 16, Cousins was ruled out indefinitely after suffering a torn left quadriceps in Game 2 of the first round of the playoffs. He made a return in Game 1 of the 2019 NBA Finals against the Toronto Raptors, coming off the bench in his first NBA Finals game. The Warriors lost the series in six games.

Los Angeles Lakers (2019–2020)
On July 6, 2019, Cousins signed a one-year contract with the Los Angeles Lakers. Cousins was reunited with Anthony Davis, his former teammate on the New Orleans Pelicans. However, he tore his left anterior cruciate ligament (ACL) in an off-season pickup game in August, and never played a game for the Lakers. They were granted a $1.75 million disabled player exception for Cousins and waived him on February 23, 2020, to sign Markieff Morris. The Lakers won the NBA championship that season and had Cousins' name engraved on their championship rings.

Houston Rockets (2020–2021)
On December 1, 2020, Cousins signed a one-year contract with the Houston Rockets. On December 2, the Rockets traded for John Wall, his good friend and former college teammate. On February 23, 2021, the Rockets waived Cousins. In 25 games with the Rockets, he averaged 9.6 points and 7.6 rebounds in 20.2 minutes.

Los Angeles Clippers (2021)
On April 5, 2021, Cousins signed a 10-day contract with the Los Angeles Clippers. On April 16, he signed a second 10-day contract and ten days later, he signed for the rest of the season. With the Clippers, he played a total of 16 games, all on the bench. in these 16 games he averaged 7.8 points 4.5 rebounds and 1 assists. His season high with the Clippers was 16 points in a loss to the New Orleans Pelicans.

Milwaukee Bucks (2021–2022)
On November 30, 2021, Cousins signed with the Milwaukee Bucks. On December 24, Cousins scored a season-high 22 points alongside grabbing 8 rebounds in a 102–95 win over the Dallas Mavericks. On January 6, 2022, he was waived. During his 17-game tenure with the Bucks, Cousins started 5 games and averaged 9.1 points, 5.8 rebounds, and 1.1 assists in 16.9 minutes per game.

Denver Nuggets (2022)
On January 21, 2022, Cousins signed a 10-day contract with the Denver Nuggets, reuniting with his former coach Michael Malone. On January 28, he was given a second 10-day contract. On February 10, he signed a third 10-day contract. On February 25, the Nuggets signed Cousins for the remainder of the season. On March 4, Cousins scored a season-high 31 points, along with nine rebounds, four assists, and three steals in a 116–101 win over the Houston Rockets. His 31 points in 24 minutes were the fewest minutes in a 30-point game in Nuggets franchise history and the third fewest minutes played in a 30-point game in his career, as well as his third career 30-point game in 35 minutes or fewer, equalling Freeman Williams for the most such games in the shot clock era.

On January 13, 2023, the Los Angeles Lakers hosted Cousins for a workout.

National team career

Cousins was a member of the United States national team that won the gold medal at the 2014 FIBA Basketball World Cup. In 2016, he won his second gold medal with Team USA at the Summer Olympics in Rio de Janeiro, Brazil.

Career statistics

NBA

Regular season

|-
| style="text-align:left;"|
| style="text-align:left;"|Sacramento
| 81 || 62 || 28.5 || .430 || .167 || .687 || 8.6 || 2.5 || 1.0 || .8 || 14.1
|-
| style="text-align:left;"|
| style="text-align:left;"|Sacramento
| 64 || 62 || 30.5 || .448 || .143 || .702 || 11.0 || 1.6 || 1.5 || 1.2 || 18.1
|-
| style="text-align:left;"|
| style="text-align:left;"|Sacramento
| 75 || 74 || 30.5 || .465 || .182 || .738 || 9.9 || 2.7 || 1.4 || .7 || 17.1
|-
| style="text-align:left;"|
| style="text-align:left;"|Sacramento
| 71 || 71 || 32.4 || .496 || .000 || .726 || 11.7 || 2.9 || 1.5 || 1.3 || 22.7
|-
| style="text-align:left;"|
| style="text-align:left;"|Sacramento
| 59 || 59 || 34.1 || .467 || .250 || .782 || 12.7 || 3.6 || 1.5 || 1.8 || 24.1
|-
| style="text-align:left;"|
| style="text-align:left;"|Sacramento
| 65 || 65 || 34.6 || .451 || .333 || .718 || 11.5 || 3.3 || 1.6 || 1.4 || 26.9
|-
| style="text-align:left;"|
| style="text-align:left;"|Sacramento
| 55 || 55 || 34.4 || .451 || .356 || .770 || 10.6 || 4.8 || 1.4 || 1.3 || 27.8
|-
| style="text-align:left;"|2016–17
| style="text-align:left;"|New Orleans
| 17 || 17 || 33.8 || .452 || .375 || .777 || 12.5 || 3.9 || 1.5 || 1.1 || 24.4
|-
| style="text-align:left;"|
| style="text-align:left;"|New Orleans
| 48 || 48 || 36.2 || .470 || .354 || .746 || 12.9 || 5.4 || 1.6 || 1.6 || 25.2
|-
| style="text-align:left;"|
| style="text-align:left;"|Golden State
| 30 || 30 || 25.7 || .480 || .274 || .736 || 8.2 || 3.6 || 1.3 || 1.5 || 16.3
|-
| style="text-align:left;"|
| style="text-align:left;"|Houston
| 25 || 11 || 20.2 || .376 || .336 || .746 || 7.6 || 2.4 || .8 || .7 || 9.6
|-
| style="text-align:left;"|2020–21
| style="text-align:left;"|L.A. Clippers
| 16 || 0 || 12.9 || .537 || .421 || .682 || 4.5 || 1.0 || .8 || .4 || 7.8
|-
| style="text-align:left;"|
| style="text-align:left;"|Milwaukee
| 17 || 5 || 16.9 || .466 || .271 || .816 || 5.8 || 1.1 || .9 || .5 || 9.1
|-
| style="text-align:left;"|
| style="text-align:left;"|Denver
| 31 || 2 || 13.9 || .456 || .324 || .736 || 5.5 || 1.7 || .6 || .4 || 8.9
|- class="sortbottom"
| style="text-align:center;" colspan="2"|Career
| 654 || 561 || 29.8 || .460 || .331 || .737 || 10.2 || 3.0 || 1.3 || 1.1 || 19.6
|- class="sortbottom"
| style="text-align:center;" colspan="2"|All-Star
| 4 || 0 || 10.4 || .800 || .500 || .667 || 3.7 || .3 || .3 || .0 || 9.3

Playoffs

|-
| style="text-align:left;"|2019
| style="text-align:left;"|Golden State
| 8 || 5 || 16.6 || .396 || .250 || .640 || 4.9 || 2.4 || .6 || .8 || 7.6
|-
| style="text-align:left;"|2021
| style="text-align:left;"|L.A. Clippers
| 7 || 0 || 8.3 || .452 || .400 || .786 || 2.0 || .7 || .3 || .4 || 7.6
|-
| style="text-align:left;"|2022
| style="text-align:left;"|Denver
| 5 || 0 || 11.4 || .655 || .667 || .733 || 3.4 || 1.2 || .6 || .2 || 10.6
|- class="sortbottom"
| style="text-align:center;" colspan="2"|Career
| 20 || 5 || 12.4 || .476 || .392 || .704 || 3.5 || 1.5 || .5 || .5 || 8.4

College

|-
| style="text-align:left;"|2009–10
| style="text-align:left;"|Kentucky
| 38 || 38 || 23.5 || .558 || .167 || .604 || 9.8 || 1.0 || 1.0 || 1.8 || 15.1

Personal life
Cousins is the son of Monique and Jessie Cousins. He has four sisters and one brother, Jaleel, who is also a professional basketball player.

Cousins has two children. He married his longtime girlfriend Morgan Lang in Atlanta on August 24, 2019.

In August 2019, Cousins was captured on an audio recording threatening to kill his ex-girlfriend after she refused to let their son attend his wedding. An arrest warrant was placed on Cousins for a misdemeanor domestic violence charge and a third-degree harassing communications charge. The charges, filed in Alabama, were dropped in November.

References

External links

 Kentucky Wildcats bio

1990 births
Living people
2014 FIBA Basketball World Cup players
21st-century African-American sportspeople
African-American basketball players
All-American college men's basketball players
American men's basketball players
Basketball players at the 2016 Summer Olympics
Basketball players from Alabama
Centers (basketball)
Denver Nuggets players
FIBA Basketball World Cup-winning players
Golden State Warriors players
Houston Rockets players
Kentucky Wildcats men's basketball players
Los Angeles Clippers players
McDonald's High School All-Americans
Medalists at the 2016 Summer Olympics
Milwaukee Bucks players
National Basketball Association All-Stars
New Orleans Pelicans players
Olympic gold medalists for the United States in basketball
Parade High School All-Americans (boys' basketball)
Sacramento Kings draft picks
Sacramento Kings players
Sportspeople from Mobile, Alabama
United States men's national basketball team players